The 2015 FIBA Oceania Championship for Men was the 22nd edition of the tournament. The tournament featured a two-game series between Australia and New Zealand. It also served as the qualifying tournament of FIBA Oceania for basketball at the 2016 Summer Olympics in Rio de Janeiro, Brazil. The first game was held in Melbourne, Australia on August 15, followed by the second game in Wellington, New Zealand on August 18.

Australia won both games of the series, and with an aggregate score of 160-138, qualified to the 2016 Olympics. With the loss, New Zealand qualified to the 2016 FIBA World Olympic Qualifying Tournament for Men, the final qualifying tournament for the 2016 Olympics.

Venues

Squads

Australia

|}
| valign="top" |
Head coach

Assistant coaches

Legend
Club – lastclub before the tournament
Age – ageon 15 August 2015
|}

New Zealand

|}
| valign="top" |
Head coach

Assistant coaches

Legend
Club – describes lastclub before the tournament
Age – describes ageon 15 August 2015
|}

Results

|}

Game 1
All times are local (UTC+10)

Game 2
All times are local (UTC+12).

Final rankings

References

External links
Boomers (AUS) v Tall Blacks (NZL) - Game 1 - Full Game - 2015 FIBA Oceania Championship
Tall Blacks (NZL) v Boomers (AUS) - Game 2 - Full Game - 2015 FIBA Oceania Championship

FIBA Oceania Championship
Championship
2015 in New Zealand basketball
2014–15 in Australian basketball
International basketball competitions hosted by Australia
International basketball competitions hosted by New Zealand
Australia men's national basketball team games
New Zealand men's national basketball team games